John Victor Wilson (17 January 1921 – 5 June 2008) was an English first-class cricketer, who played for and captained Yorkshire County Cricket Club. He was born in Scampston near Norton-on-Derwent in the East Riding of Yorkshire (now in North Yorkshire).

Wilson made his first-class debut for Yorkshire in 1946, as a left-handed batsman, and a very occasional right-arm medium pace bowler. He was also an occasional wicket-keeper and a talented fielder close to the bat. In 1954-55, he was a surprise selection for the Marylebone Cricket Club (MCC) tour to Australia and New Zealand under Leonard Hutton, but he never adjusted to the fast pace of Australian pitches, and was not picked for any of the Test matches. He also represented MCC at home in 1962 and 1963.

Though he was by then far from guaranteed a place in the first team, Wilson survived the purge of Yorkshire's playing staff in 1958 which saw Johnny Wardle, Bob Appleyard and Frank Lowson leave the staff and a new young team take shape under the captaincy of Ronnie Burnet. After Burnet retired, Wilson was appointed as the first professional county captain of Yorkshire in 1960. He had a successful tenure, leading the club to the County Championship title in 1960 and 1962. He retired in 1962, and was succeeded by Brian Close for the 1963 season.

Wilson was a Wisden Cricketer of the Year in 1961.

Wilson died in his home in Yedingham, near Malton, on 5 June 2008, aged 87.

References

External links
 
 Obituary: Telegraph

1921 births
2008 deaths
Yorkshire cricketers
Yorkshire cricket captains
Wisden Cricketers of the Year
People from Norton-on-Derwent
English cricketers
Marylebone Cricket Club cricketers
Lincolnshire cricketers
Players cricketers
North v South cricketers
T. N. Pearce's XI cricketers